The 1977 Pepsi Grand Slam, officially the  Pepsi-Cola Grand Slam of Tennis, was a men's tennis tournament played on outdoor green clay courts at the Mission Hills Country Club in Boca Raton, Florida, United States It was an Association of Tennis Professionals (ATP) sanctioned special event that was not part of the 1977 Colgate-Palmolive Grand Prix circuit. It was the second edition of the tournament and was held from January 21 through January 23, 1977.  Björn Borg won the singles title and earned $100,000 first prize money

Final

Singles
 Björn Borg defeated  Jimmy Connors 6–4, 5–7, 6–3
 It was Borg's 2nd singles title of the year and the 20th of his career.

Prize money

Draw

See also
 Borg–Connors rivalry

References

External links
 ITF tournament edition details

Pepsi Grand Slam
Pepsi Grand Slam
Pepsi Grand Slam
Pepsi Grand Slam